Bechtle is a surname. Notable people with the surname include:

 Louis Bechtle (born 1927), United States federal judge
 Robert Bechtle (1932–2020), American painter